Senator Richmond may refer to:

George N. Richmond (1821–1896), Wisconsin State Senate
John P. Richmond (1811–1895), Illinois State Senate
Tom Richmond (Montana politician), Montana State Senate
Volney Richmond (1802–1864), New York State Senate